The Georgia First Offender Act (Georgia Code § 42-8-60) is a legal resource for certain first time criminal offenders to not plead guilty, and have their records expunged if they comply with the law's provisions. Upon successful compliance with this law, the defendant's criminal record is expunged on application to the court.

References

External links
 Georgia Code: Via Justica.org  "§ 42-8-60 - Probation prior to adjudication of guilt" 
 Georgia Code via Lexus-Nexis  (partially behind paywall except for text of government statute).
 Georgia Bureau of Investigations FAQ  (Government Website)

Georgia (U.S. state) law